Suchdol nad Odrou is a market town in Nový Jičín District in the Moravian-Silesian Region of the Czech Republic. It has about 2,700 inhabitants.

Administrative parts
The village of Kletné is an administrative part of Suchdol nad Odrou.

History
The first written mention of Suchdol is from 1257. The village was founded by Slavic settlers in the early 13th century. The population of German nationality gradually prevailed.

In the 18th century, 280 inhabitants left for Herrnhut, where they restored the Moravian Church and established mission settlements around the world.

Until 1918, Suchdol was a part of the Austrian monarchy (Austria side after the compromise of 1867), in the Neutitschein (Nový Jičín) District, one of the 34 Bezirkshauptmannschaften in Moravia.

Notable people
David Nitschmann (1695/96–1772), German missionary
David Zeisberger (1721–1808), German missionary
Bernard Rudofsky (1905–1988), Austrian-American architect
Heinz Nawratil (1937–2015), German lawyer and author

References

External links

Market towns in the Czech Republic